Paide E-Piim Sports Hall is a sport venue in Paide, Estonia.

The hall was opened on 20 February 2009. On 1 February 2012, the hall was named to E-Piim Sports Hall.

The hall's capacity is about 800.

The hall has a sport hall with area of 1400 m2.

References

Sports venues in Estonia
Indoor arenas in Estonia
Paide